Bekithemba Ndlovu (born 9 August 1976) is a retired Zimbabwean football defender. A Zimbabwe international, he played at the 2000, 2003 and 2004 COSAFA Cup and the 2004 African Cup of Nations.

References 

1976 births
Living people
Zimbabwean footballers
Zimbabwe international footballers
Association football defenders
Zimbabwean expatriate footballers
Expatriate soccer players in South Africa
Zimbabwean expatriate sportspeople in South Africa
Highlanders F.C. players
Moroka Swallows F.C. players
Platinum Stars F.C. players
Bantu Tshintsha Guluva Rovers F.C. players
Gunners F.C. players